Politeknik Brunei (abbreviation: PB; ; Jawi: ڤوليتيكنيك بروني) is the first polytechnic in Brunei. The establishment of Politeknik Brunei was consented by His Majesty the Sultan and Yang Di-Pertuan of Brunei Darussalam in a Titah delivered during the Teacher's Day celebration on 18 October 2008 to accelerate the country's human resources development, emphasised by the National Development Plan (NDP) and Brunei Vision 2035. This technical education transformation was a timely response towards the evolution of the local and global economic landscape, which directly affected the current and future skilled workforce requirements of the nation.

Schools 
There are five schools under Politeknik Brunei, namely:
 School of Business (Sekolah Perdagangan)
 School of Information Communication and Technology (Sekolah Teknologi Maklumat dan Komunikasi)
 School of Science and Engineering (Sekolah Sains dan Kejuruteraan)
 School of Health Sciences (Sekolah Sains Kesihatan)
 School of Petrochemical (Sekolah Petrokimia)

Campus 
At present, Politeknik Brunei has two campuses. The main campus and the campus for the School of Health Sciences are located in Brunei-Muara District whereas another satellite campus is located in Belait District.

Main campus 
The main campus in Brunei-Muara is a temporary campus, located in one of the condominiums at Jalan Ong Sum Ping in Bandar Seri Begawan. The schools located here include the School of Business and School of Information Technology. The programmes conducted here are mainly related to business and information technology.

The office of the Director as well as other administrative offices can also be found on this campus.

Satellite campus 
The campus for the School of Health Sciences is integrated to the PAPRSB Institute of Health Sciences of the University of Brunei Darussalam. Programmes conducted under this school were formerly conducted by the university but since 2016 they are subsumed under the governance of Brunei Polytechnic.

The Belait campus is located in Lumut, approximately 91 kilometres from the main campus, and houses the School of Science and Engineering. Programmes conducted here are mostly related to engineering but there are also programmes for interior design and architecture.

Programmes 

Politeknik Brunei opened its doors in January 2012 introducing nine 2-year Advanced Diploma programmes in the various fields of Business, ICT and Science and Engineering.  
 
Three years later in July 2015, Politeknik Brunei revamped its former Advanced Diploma programmes and began offering its new 3-year Level 5 Diploma programmes to students with a minimum qualification of 5 GCE ‘O’ Level credits (based on relevant subjects), as well as those with Technical and Vocational Education and Training (TVET) qualifications. The new Level 5 Diploma qualification is equivalent to Higher National Diploma (HND).
 
Since then, a total of twenty-two (22) academic Diploma programmes are currently being offered by the four Schools under Politeknik Brunei – the School of Business, the School of Information and Communication Technology, the School of Science and Engineering and the School of Health Sciences.

References

External links

Universities and colleges in Brunei
Educational institutions established in 2012
2012 establishments in Brunei